Georges Lemmen (1865–1916) was a neo-impressionist painter from Belgium.  He was a member of Les XX from 1888. His works include The Beach at Heist, Aline Marechal and Vase of Flowers. Yvonne Serruys studied in his workshop in Brussels from 1892 to 1894.

Gallery

Bibliography
 P. & V. Berko, "Dictionary of Belgian painters born between 1750 & 1875", Knokke 1981, p. 418.

See also 
Pointillism
Georges Seurat
History of painting
Western painting
Post-Impressionism

References

External links 

 http://www.abcgallery.com/P/pointillism/lemmen.html

Belgian painters
1865 births
1916 deaths
Post-impressionist painters
Pointillism
People from Schaerbeek